Carlos Geovanni Chávez Ospina (born 7 August 1984) is a Colombian former professional footballer who played as a goalkeeper.

Career 
Chavez joined América de Cali's youth academy at age 8, and made his professional debut with the club in 2005. He spent most of his time at the club on loans to Cortuluá in 2006 and Unión Magdalena in 2007. In 2008, he joined Patriotas Boyacá of the Categoría Primera B. In 2010, he spent one year on loan at Peruvian club Inti Gas.

On 17 December 2011, Patriotas beat Chavez's former club, America de Cali, in the 2011 promotion playoffs and Chavez scored the last penalty in the shootout, which sent America to the second division for the first time in the club's history. Chavez had no reaction to scoring the winning penalty, but he was hit with death threats after the match. The goalkeeper left the club in 2012, joining Atlético Bucaramanga and playing with them for the 2013 season, where he scored 3 goals. In 2014 and 2015 he played for Uniautónoma. 

The keeper finally announced his retirement at the conclusion of the 2016 season, having spent the year with Atlético Cali.

See also 
 List of goalscoring goalkeepers

References

External links 
 
 Carlos Chávez at Football-Lineups.com

1984 births
Living people
Colombian footballers
Colombian expatriate footballers
América de Cali footballers
Cortuluá footballers
Unión Magdalena footballers
Patriotas Boyacá footballers
Ayacucho FC footballers
Atlético Bucaramanga footballers
Uniautónoma F.C. footballers
Atlético F.C. footballers
Categoría Primera A players
Expatriate footballers in Peru
Association football goalkeepers
Footballers from Cali